This is a list of notable events relating to the environment in 1954. They relate to environmental law, conservation, environmentalism and environmental issues.

Events
The Nile perch were introduced into Lake Victoria in East Africa and since then it has been fished commercially. It is attributed with causing the extinction or near-extinction of several hundred native species

July
The Atomic Energy Act of 1954 was passed in the United States.

See also

Human impact on the environment

References